Yefri Antonio Reyes Pinto (born 22 May 1996) is a Venezuelan professional footballer who plays as a midfielder for Monagas.

Career
Reyes began his career in Argentina with Chacarita Juniors. He was selected for his senior debut by Walter Coyette in July 2017, with the midfielder appearing for eighty-three minutes of a Copa Argentina defeat to Guillermo Brown. His league bow arrived nine months later during an Argentine Primera División game with Temperley, which was the first of three appearances in a year that ended with relegation to Primera B Nacional.

On 1 February 2019, it was announced that Reyes had signed for Venezuelan Primera División club Monagas.

Personal life
Though born in Venezuela, Reyes is a nationalized citizen of Colombia.

Career statistics
.

References

External links

1996 births
Living people
Footballers from Caracas
Naturalized citizens of Colombia
Venezuelan footballers
Association football midfielders
Venezuelan expatriate footballers
Expatriate footballers in Argentina
Venezuelan expatriate sportspeople in Argentina
Argentine Primera División players
Primera Nacional players
Venezuelan Primera División players
Chacarita Juniors footballers
Monagas S.C. players